Piz Arina (2,828 m) is a mountain of the Samnaun Alps, located north of Ramosch in the canton of Graubünden. It lies east of the Val Sinestra, on the range descending from the Muttler.

References

External links
 Piz Arina on Hikr

Mountains of the Alps
Mountains of Graubünden
Mountains of Switzerland
Two-thousanders of Switzerland
Valsot